Xiang Jun (born 20 October 1983, in Wuhan) is a Chinese football player.

Club career
Xiang Jun started his professional football career playing for Shenzhen's youth team and would eventually graduate to their senior team in the 2002 league season where he made eight league appearances. The following season he would find it difficult to gain any consistent regular playing time within the team and in the 2004 Chinese Super League season he would not feature at all within the title winning team. A fringe player for Shenzhen it wasn't until the 2007 Chinese Super League season that saw Xiang Jun finally make an impact within the team and earn himself the nickname "Da Tou" (Big Head) for his heading ability that saw him help Shenzhen fight off relegation when he was given a run of fourteen league games.

By the 2010 Chinese Super League season Xiang Jun would still be unable to gain a regular starting position within the team and the club's new manager Siniša Gogić would allow him to be loaned out in July to second tier club Beijing BIT. By the 2011 Chinese Super League season Xiang Jun would return to Shenzhen and the club's new manager Philippe Troussier would give him a significantly larger role within the club, however by the end of the season the club were relegated.

Club career stats
Last update: March, 2010

References

External links
Player stats at sohu.com
Player news at sina.com.cn

1983 births
Living people
Footballers from Wuhan
Chinese footballers
Shenzhen F.C. players
Chinese Super League players
China League One players
Association football defenders